Gordon Hewitt (20 March 1958 – 18 November 2009) was a British swimmer. He competed in the men's 200 metre butterfly at the 1976 Summer Olympics.

References

External links
 

1958 births
2009 deaths
British male swimmers
Olympic swimmers of Great Britain
Swimmers at the 1976 Summer Olympics
Place of birth missing